Prickly grevillea may refer to:

 Grevillea aquifolium
 Grevillea halmaturina

Grevillea taxa by common name